Kalyaan is an Indian film director and screenwriter who has been working in Tamil film Industry.He is notable for his commercially successful  films like Gulaebaghavali and Jackpot .

Career
Kalyaan made a breakthrough as a potential director after winning the second season of the Tamil reality show, Naalaiya Iyakkunar.

He began making his directorial debut film, Katha Solla Porom in 2014, but the film did not find distributors and was put on hold. He then began work on Kaathadi, during October 2014. Sai Dhanshika was signed on to play a police officer, while Avishek Karthik, previously seen in Gautham Vasudev Menon's Vaaranam Aayiram (2008) and Nadunisi Naaygal (2011), was selected to portray the lead actor. The film began production in late 2014 and was revealed to be in post-production by October 2015. The movie was shot extensively in Chennai, Kerala and Yelagiri hills. A long delay before the release of the film meant that the two other films of Kalyaan, Katha Solla Porom (2016) and the Prabhu Deva-starrer Gulaebaghavali (2018), were released before Kaathadi, which released in February 2018.

Filmography

References

Living people
Film directors from Tamil Nadu
Tamil film directors
Tamil film producers
21st-century Indian film directors
Year of birth missing (living people)